The sixth season of America's Best Dance Crew, also known as America's Best Dance Crew: Season of the Superstars, premiered on April 7, 2011. Taking a different route from past seasons, the crews performed to the music of one specific artist each week, including Rihanna, Lil Wayne, and other stars. The season also featured special guest appearances by various music celebrities including Justin Bieber, The Black Eyed Peas, Katy Perry, Kesha, Nicki Minaj, and Kanye West. Dominic "D-Trix" Sandoval, a former member of Quest Crew, the winner of the third season of America's Best Dance Crew, joined returning judges Lil Mama and JC Chasez as the newest judge. In the season finale, which aired on June 5, 2011, I.aM.mE was declared the winner.

Cast
For the sixth season of America's Best Dance Crew, auditions were held in four cities: Chicago, Houston, New York City, and Los Angeles. The age requirement for auditioning, used in the previous five seasons, was dropped. A total of ten dance crews were selected to compete. This was the first season to showcase a crew from the Pacific region.

Results

:  A non-elimination episode meant to showcase the two finalists.
Key
 (WINNER) The dance crew won the competition and was crowned "America's Best Dance Crew".
 (RUNNER-UP) The dance crew was the runner-up in the competition.
 (IN) The dance crew was safe from elimination.
 (RISK) The dance crew was at risk for elimination.
 (OUT) The dance crew was eliminated from the competition.

Episodes

Episode 1: Lil Wayne Challenge
Original Airdate: April 7, 2011
The first five crews auditioned for a chance to move on in the competition during the season premiere, beginning with a group performance to "6 Foot 7 Foot" featuring Cory Gunz.

Safe: Street Kingdom, Phunk Phenomenon, I.aM.mE, ReQuest Dance Crew
Eliminated: Eclectic Gentlemen

Episode 2: Ke$ha Challenge
Original Airdate: April 14, 2011
The next five crews performed to Ke$ha hits to compete for a chance to move on to the next round, starting with a dance number to "We R Who We R".

Safe: FootworKINGz, ICONic Boyz, 787 Crew, Instant Noodles
Eliminated: Jag6ed

Episode 3: The Black Eyed Peas Challenge
Original Airdate: April 21, 2011
The Black Eyed Peas assigned each crew a different song and challenge to incorporate into their routines.

 Safe: ICONic Boyz, Phunk Phenomenon, I.aM.mE, Street Kingdom, 787 Crew, Instant Noodles
 Bottom 2: FootworKINGz, ReQuest Dance Crew
 Eliminated: FootworKINGz

Episode 4: Katy Perry Challenge
Original Airdate: April 28, 2011
Katy Perry handed out dance challenges to the seven remaining crews.

 Safe: Phunk Phenomenon, I.aM.mE, 787 Crew, ICONic Boyz, Instant Noodles
 Bottom 2: Street Kingdom, ReQuest Dance Crew
 Eliminated: ReQuest Dance Crew

Episode 5: Rihanna Challenge
Original Airdate: May 5, 2011
The six remaining crews choreographed routines inspired by Rihanna. Rihanna's choreographer, Tanisha Scott, gave each crew a dancehall move to be incorporated.

 Safe: Instant Noodles, ICONic Boyz, I.aM.mE, Street Kingdom
 Bottom 2: 787 Crew, Phunk Phenomenon
 Eliminated: 787 Crew

Episode 6: Justin Bieber Challenge
Original Airdate: May 12, 2011
Justin Bieber handed out dance challenges to the five remaining crews. All the challenges were based on moments from Bieber's documentary Never Say Never.

 Safe: ICONic Boyz, I.aM.mE, Phunk Phenomenon
 Bottom 2: Instant Noodles, Street Kingdom
 Eliminated: Instant Noodles

Episode 7: Nicki Minaj Challenge
Original Airdate: May 19, 2011
The final four crews kicked off the show with a group number to "Massive Attack" featuring Sean Garrett. Then, Nicki Minaj dropped by and challenged the four remaining crews to choreograph routines inspired by one of her alter egos. 

 Safe: I.aM.mE, ICONic Boyz
 Bottom 2: Street Kingdom, Phunk Phenomenon
 Eliminated: Street Kingdom

Episode 8: Kanye West Challenge
Original Airdate: May 26, 2011
The episode began with the three remaining crews performing a group number to "All of the Lights" featuring Rihanna. Season 5 winner Poreotix delivered the challenges to the crews. After the mid-show elimination, the final two crews performed their prepared routines to make their one last plea for votes.

Challenge #1: Kanye West Challenge
The crews had to demonstrate their versatility by creating a routine that incorporated three different styles of dance. All crews were given the same styles and songs.

Safe: ICONic Boyz
Bottom 2: Phunk Phenomenon, I.aM.mE
Eliminated: Phunk Phenomenon

Challenge #2: Last Chance Challenge
The two finalists were given one last chance to perform before the lines opened for the final voting session of the season.

Episode 9: Battle of the Final Two
Original Airdate: June 2, 2011
The final two crews faced off in the penultimate episode of Season 6, which also featured a look back at their accomplishments so far.

Challenge #1
For the first challenge, the judges chose one routine from the past weeks in which the crews must improve upon and perform again. The judges selected I.aM.mE's Week 5 Rihanna performance and ICONic Boyz' Week 6 Justin Bieber routine.

Challenge #2
The two crews then performed in a three-round dance battle. Swizz Beatz returned to provide the music for the battle.

Episode 10: The Finale
Original Airdate: June 5, 2011
The winner was crowned in the Season 6 finale, which also featured performances by the past winners. In contrast to previous seasons of America's Best Dance Crew, the finale was pre-recorded; each crew taped a faux winning and losing reaction, as well as their victory performance, and were unaware of the results until the final cut of the episode was aired prior to the 2011 MTV Movie Awards.

Winner: I.aM.mE
Runner-up: ICONic Boyz

References

External links
 

2011 American television seasons
America's Best Dance Crew